Poomulli is a Namboothiri family whose origins go back over 900 years. Poomulli's name has been closely associated with the culture and heritage of Kerala.

Early history
The Poomulli Mana was a Namboothiri family residing in Ūrakam of the Peruvanam village about 900 years ago. They built the original Ammathiruvadi Temple, left all that they owned to the temple, and gave the temple administration to the Kingdom of Kochi. Then they left the village and resettled themselves in Peringode of the present-day Palakkad,nearby Ottappalam.

In folklore
Legend has it that Namboothiri (while in the Peruvanam village) went to Kanchipuram to visit the Kamakshi Amman Temple. Happy with the devotion of the Namboothiri, Kanchi Kamakshi decided to come to Kerala on his palm-leaf umbrella. He reached home, and placed the umbrella on the floor of his house. When he came back later he was unable to take back the umbrella. It was heavily grounded to the floor. Later upon further investigation, it was revealed that Kanchi Kamakshi was residing on that umbrella. The goddess came into Namboothiri’s dreams that night and let him know that he was supposed to build a temple for the goddess, and leave Ūrakam. She also let him know that he was to find an idol in a well far away and he was to transfer the goddess from the umbrella onto that idol. Namboothiri did as the goddess wished, and he built the temple and left all that he owned to the temple.

Later history
Poomulli Mana later grew to be one of the richest and most powerful Namboothiri families of Kerala and one of the biggest landlords of Malabar. The head of the family used to be invited to all the important functions in the court of the Samoothirippad of Kozhikode, and the Maharajas of Thiruvithaamkoor. The family was well known for their hospitality and considered Anna-Danam as their dharma. The Poomulli family was involved in encouraging the arts and sciences.
The members of Poomully Mana were practitioners and experts in Ayurveda, Rig-veda, Yoga, Kalari (martial art)Music & other cultural arts. Late.Sri.Poomully Narayanan Namboodirippad (father of Aramthampuran & Rig-veda practitioner), Late.Sri. Poomully Raman Namboothiripad, student of the musician Chembai Vaidyanatha Bhagavatar and Late.Sri. Poomulli Neelakandan Namboothiripad (Aramthampuran) the Ayurveda practitioner, are better known among them. Still, other personalities from within the country and abroad visit Poomully mana for Ayurveda treatments and for practice in arts & cultural form.

See also
Ammathiruvadi Temple

References

https://www.youtube.com/watch?v=UC3TPqKmoYA
https://www.youtube.com/watch?v=ZuxgqfZoTMA

https://www.youtube.com/watch?v=dv4GCywBVKk

External links
 
 
 
 

Kerala society
Ayurveda
History of Kerala
Indian noble families